Johannes Jacobus Willebrordus "Joost" Zwagerman (18 November 1963 – 8 September 2015) was a Dutch writer, poet and essayist.  Among his teachers was the novelist Oek de Jong.

Early life and education 

Johannes Jacobus Willebrordus Zwagerman was born on 18 November 1963 in Alkmaar, Netherlands.

At the age of nine, Zwagerman compiled a magazine, De Zwagergids, of texts and images from TV magazines.

Zwagerman received his high-school education at the Rijksscholengemeenschap Noord-Kennemerland in Alkmaar, where he graduated from havo and moved on to study at the Pedagogische Academie. Afterwards he went on to study Dutch language (Nederlandse taal- en letterkunde, unfinished)  He was a student at a course of creative writing by Oek de Jong.

Work 

Zwagerman made his debut with the novel De houdgreep in 1986. His second novel, Gimmick! (1989), was adapted as a play, and reached a much wider audience. He wrote his third book, Vals licht, in 1991 was short listed for the AKO Literatuurprijs. Vals Licht was the basis for a movie by Theo van Gogh (1993).
More novels followed, including Chaos en Rumoer, Zes Sterren and De buitenvrouw. 
Zwagerman's work has been translated into twelve languages, including German, French and Japanese.

Besides books, Zwagerman also published poetry and essays. His first collection of poems was published in 1987 Langs de doofpot. The Awater poetry prize was awarded for his most recent collection Roeshoofd hemelt, which was reprinted four times.
Among his essay works are the Pornotheek Arcadië (2001) and Het vijfde seizoen (2003).

Zwagerman was also active as a columnist for the Dutch newspapers, previously for the de Volkskrant (1998–2002) and since 2001 for NRC Handelsblad. Additionally he was the host of a Dutch television programme (Zomergasten) and appeared in theater with the Dutch writer Ronald Giphart.
Besides his work as a writer and columnist, he also frequently appeared on Dutch national television, in the program De Wereld Draait Door,  broadcast by VARA, where he often held mini-lectures on art-related topics. As an amateur art lover himself, Zwagerman enjoyed transmitting his love for art to a wider audience.

As a writer Zwagerman was connected to two universities; in 1998 Rijksuniversiteit Groningen and 2003 Universiteit Leiden. He also lectured at the Radboud Universiteit Nijmegen during the Frans Kellendonk Lecture in 2006.
In January 2008, Zwagerman was awarded the Gouden Ganzenveer, for his extraordinary contribution to the Dutch written culture.

Until his divorce, Joost Zwagerman lived with his wife and three children in Amsterdam. In December 2012 he settled in Haarlem.

Death 
On 8 September 2015, de Volkskrant confirmed that Zwagerman had committed suicide. He was found dead at his home in Haarlem.

Bibliography 
1986 – De houdgreep, roman 
1987 – Kroondomein, verhalen
1987 – Langs de doofpot, gedichten
1988 – De ziekte van jij, gedichten
1989 – Gimmick!, roman
1991 – Vals licht, roman
1993 – Collega's van God, essays
1993 – De kus van Michael Jackson, columns
1993 – De mooiste vrouw ter wereld, gedichten
1994 – De buitenvrouw, roman
1996 – Tomaatsj, novelle
1996 – In het wild. Essays en kritieken
1997 – Chaos en rumoer, roman
1998 – Het jongensmeisje, verhalen
2000 – Pornotheek Arcadië, essays
2001 – Bekentenissen van de pseudomaan, gedichten
2001 – Landschap met klein vuil, columns
2002 – Zes sterren, roman
2003 – Het wilde westen, columns
2003 – Het vijfde seizoen, essays
2004 – Tussen droom en daad in Dubbelstad: Alkmaar in feit en fictie
2005 – Roeshoofd hemelt, gedichten
2005 – Door eigen hand. Zelfmoord en de nabestaanden, essays en interviews
2005 – De Nederlandse en Vlaamse literatuur vanaf 1880 in 250 verhalen, bloemlezing
2005 – Tot hier en zelfs verder, de vroege gedichten
2006 – Perfect Day en andere popverhalen
2006 – Transito, essays
2006 – De Nederlandse en Vlaamse literatuur vanaf 1880 in 60 lange verhalen, bloemlezing
2007 – De schaamte voor links, pamphlet
2007 – Hollands welvaren, non fictie 
2007 – De ontdekking van de literatuur. The Paris Review Interviews, bloemlezing
2008 – De Nederlandse en Vlaamse literatuur vanaf 1880 in 200 essays, bloemlezing
2009 – Hitler in de polder & Vrij van God, pamphlet
2010 – , Boekenweekgeschenk 2010
2016 – The Penguin Book of Dutch Short Stories, anthology
2016 – Americana : een keuze uit zijn omzwervingen in de Amerikaanse cultuur, essays over Amerikaanse cultuur, schrijvers en kunstenaars.

References

External links 

  Profile at the Digital library for Dutch literature
  Website van Joost Zwagerman
 

1963 births
2015 suicides
Dutch essayists
20th-century Dutch novelists
20th-century male writers
21st-century Dutch novelists
Dutch male novelists
Dutch male poets
People from Alkmaar
Suicides in the Netherlands
Male essayists
20th-century essayists
21st-century essayists
21st-century Dutch male writers